Category V can refer to:

 Category V New Testament manuscripts - Byzantine
 Category V planetary protection
 Category V protected areas (IUCN) - Landscape/Seascape
 Category V Armed Forces Qualification Test scores - 0–9
 Category V vintage car condition - Good

See also 
 Class V (disambiguation) - class/category equivalence (for labeling)
 Group V - group/category equivalence (for labeling)
 Category 5 (disambiguation) - Roman/Arabic numbering equivalence